The 2012–13 season was the 133rd season of competitive football by Rangers.

Overview
Rangers played a total of 47 competitive matches during the 2012–13 season. Prior to the Rangers first team even kicking a ball in a football match that season, there were a series of off-the-field issues that had to be resolved. In June 2012, a criminal investigation was launched into Craig Whyte's takeover of Rangers Football Club Plc after a preliminary examination of the information passed to police by administrators Duff & Phelps. While 4 July saw ten of the other eleven Scottish Premier League clubs vote against Rangers being admitted to the league for the 2012–13 season, meaning the club had to apply for a place in the Scottish Football League. Over a week later, on 13 July, twenty-five of the thirty SFL member clubs voted to offer Rangers a place in the Third Division of the Football League for the start of the season. However, as part of the transfer of SFA membership from oldco to newco, both companies along with the SFA, SPL and SFL had to agree to a five-way agreement. The club received a twelve-month transfer ban which prevented it from registering any players over the age of eighteen, which began on 1 September and concluded at the end of the 2013 summer transfer window.

Further to this the SPL instigated an investigation into Rangers transfer dealings between 2001 and 2011, after allegations of dual contracts between Rangers Football Club PLC (the company that formerly owned Rangers) and its staff. The investigation was conducted by a commission headed by Lord Nimmo Smith and concluded in February 2013. The commission's findings concluded that Rangers Football Club PLC did not fully disclose to the football authorities all payments that it made to players and staff; however, this non-disclosure did not effect the playing staff's eligibility. Therefore, instead of a potential penalty that included the stripping of titles won by the first team, the punishment was only a fine of £250,000 for Rangers Football Club PLC. Alongside the SPL investigation, HMRC's first tier tax tribunal's came to a conclusion during the season. On 20 November, the First-tier Tax Tribunal ruled that the Rangers Football Club PLC had not contravened tax law with its use of Employee Benefit Trusts, however HMRC subsequently launched an appeal against the first-tier verdict in March 2013.

Turmoil continued inside Ibrox Stadium despite the return of Walter Smith as a non-executive director in November 2012. The company owning the club, Rangers Football Club Ltd, was floated on the stock exchange the following month, raising over £22m from an Initial public offering. The tenure of Charles Green as chief executive proved volatile, with a number of contentious issues arising throughout the season.  This included the sacking of Spanish striker Francisco Sandaza for reportedly attempting to negotiate transfer away from the club, and allegations from former chairman Craig Whyte that he and Green had an agreement over the purchase of Rangers that allowed Whyte to retain a stake in the company. An internal investigation by the club later concluded that there was no link between Green and Whyte. The culmination of Green's tenure resulted in him resigning as chief executive after the club launched an internal investigation into alleged racist remarks Green had made to commercial director Imran Ahmad.

The off the field drama was to be mirrored by some on field, at least initially, as Rangers struggled to get to grips with life in the Third Division. The very first match in August away to Peterhead ended in a 2–2 draw and that was only thanks to a late goal from Andrew Little with the Toon out playing Rangers for large spells in the match. The away day league formed resulted in subsequent draws to Annan Athletic and Berwick Rangers. The side clinched the Scottish Third Division title, and promotion to the Second Division, on 30 March after a goalless draw away to Montrose and second placed Queens Park losing.

On a busy day in April, the SFA wrote to Rangers chief executive Charles Green seeking clarification about his business dealings with Craig Whyte, the Police carried out a series of searches relating to the purchase of Rangers Football Club by Craig Whyte from Sir David Murray and Whyte was ordered to pay £18m to the finance firm Ticketus after he lost a claim against him at the High Court in London.

Players

Squad information

Transfers

In

Total expenditure: £0.7m

Out

Total income: £1.1m

New contracts

Squad statistics

Goal scorers

Last updated: 4 May 2013
Source: Match reports
Only competitive matches

Disciplinary record

Last updated: 4 May 2013
Source: Match reports
Only competitive matches

Awards

Club

Board of directors

 Craig Mather(interim from 24 April)

Coaching staff

Other staff

Matches

Scottish Third Division

Scottish Cup

League Cup

Challenge Cup

Friendlies

Competitions

Overall

Scottish Third Division

Standings

Results summary

Results by round

References 

2012-13
Scottish football clubs 2012–13 season